Sébastien Chevallier (born 14 July 1987) is a Swiss beach volleyball player. He partnered with Sascha Heyer at the 2012 Summer Olympics tournament where they lost in the round of 16.

References

1987 births
Living people
Swiss beach volleyball players
Beach volleyball players at the 2012 Summer Olympics
Beach volleyball players at the 2015 European Games

European Games competitors for Switzerland
Olympic beach volleyball players of Switzerland
21st-century Swiss people